General McMullen may refer to:

Brett James McMullen (fl. 1980s–2010s), U.S. Air Force brigadier general
Clements McMullen (1892–1959), U.S. Air Force major general
Donald McMullen (1891–1967), British Army major general
Norman MacMullen (1877–1944), British Indian Army general